The 1968 Asian Basketball Confederation Championship for Women were held in Taipei, Republic of China.

Results

Final standing

Awards

Most Valuable Player:  Annie Goh Koon Gee

See also
 List of sporting events in Taiwan

References
 Results
 archive.fiba.com
 1968 Tournament MVP

1968
1968 in women's basketball
women
International women's basketball competitions hosted by Taiwan
Basket
Basket
July 1968 sports events in Asia